Rohan Robertson (21 August 1961 – 27 December 2022) was a former Australian rules footballer who played for North Melbourne in the Victorian Football League (VFL) between 1985 and 1988. 

He made his VFL debut on the same day as his younger brother, Shane Robertson.  His father Keith also played for North Melbourne in between 1957 and 1963.

References

External links

1961 births
2022 deaths
North Melbourne Football Club players
Australian rules footballers from Victoria (Australia)

Wangaratta Rovers Football Club players
Coburg Football Club players